Orange Cove is a city in Fresno County, California, United States.

Description
Almost all of Orange Cove's residents are Hispanic, many of them farmers.

Geography

Climate
According to the Köppen Climate Classification system, Orange Cove has a hot-summer Mediterranean climate, abbreviated "Csa" on climate maps.

History
Elmer M. Sheridan founded the town in 1914, and named it prior to large scale citrus growing. The first post office opened in 1914. The city incorporated in 1948.

Demographics

2010
The population density was  people per square mile (/km). The racial makeup of Orange Cove was  White, 72 African American, 131 Native American, 101 Asian, 3 Pacific Islander,  from other races, and 350 from two or more races. Hispanic or Latino of any race were  persons.

The census reported that  people (100% of the population) lived in households, no one lived in non-institutionalized group quarters and no one was institutionalized.

There were  households, out of which  had children under the age of 18 living in them,  were opposite-sex married couples living together, 430 had a female householder with no husband present, 222 had a male householder with no wife present.  There were 207 unmarried opposite-sex partnerships, and 10 same-sex married couples or partnerships. 174 households were one person and 88 had someone living alone who was 65 or older. The average household size was 4.39.  There were  families ( of all households); the average family size was 4.53.

The age distribution was  people under the age of 18,  people aged 18 to 24,  people aged 25 to 44,  people aged 45 to 64, and 513 people who were 65 or older.  The median age was 23.6 years. For every 100 females, there were 100.9 males.  For every 100 females age 18 and over, there were 100.1 males.

The homeowner vacancy rate was 0.8%; the rental vacancy rate was 9.5%.   people ( of the population) lived in owner-occupied housing units and  people lived in rental housing units.

2000
At the 2000 census there were  people,  households, and  families in the city. The population density was  people per square mile (/km). The racial makeup of the city was 33.55% White, 0.31% Black or African American, 2.42% Native American, 1.49% Asian, 58.84% from other races, and 3.38% from two or more races.  90.60% of the population were Hispanic or Latino of any race.
There were  households, 62.7% had children under the age of 18 living with them, 61.2% were married couples living together, 18.6% had a female householder with no husband present, and 10.7% were non-families. 7.1% of households were one person and 3.7% were one person aged 65 or older.  The average household size was 4.56 and the average family size was 4.66.

The age distribution was 40.4% under the age of 18, 13.9% from 18 to 24, 28.1% from 25 to 44, 12.6% from 45 to 64, and 5.0% 65 or older.  The median age was 23 years. For every 100 females, there were 107.7 males.  For every 100 females age 18 and over, there were 108.7 males.

Males had a median income of $ versus $ for females. The per capita income for the city was $. About 39.9% of families and 44.5% of the population were below the poverty line, including 54.6% of those under age 18 and 20.0% of those age 65 or over.

Municipal government 

Orange Cove's local government includes an elected mayor, mayor pro tem, and a three-member city council. As of 2020, its current mayor is Victor P. Lopez. Lopez was mayor of Orange Cove for over three decades before being voted out of office in 2010. He was later elected to the city council in 2013 and re-elected as mayor in 2014 in what he claimed would be his last term in office, but he then went on to win re-election as mayor again in 2018.

Police department 

The community of Orange Cove maintained its own police department for many years. In 1992 however, the city disbanded its police department, due to an inadequate budget and began contracting with the Fresno County Sheriff's Department for police services.

As of December 16, 2009, the city restarted its police department.  Frank Steenport was the Chief. Later, Marty Rivera became the Chief of Police.

Education 
Schools in Orange Cove are part of the Kings Canyon Unified School District.
Orange Cove has one High School (Orange Cove High School) and Middle School (Citrus Middle School) as well as three Elementary Schools: Sheridan Elementary School, 
McCord Elementary School, and A.L. Conner Elementary School.

Parks 

U.S Senator Dianne Feinstein Park
P. Rod Skate Park
BMX Park
Sheridan Park
James O. Eaton Memorial Park, Javier Bejar Memorial

Health care 
 Adventist Health Medical Office
 United Health Centers of the San Joaquin Valley

See also

 List of towns in California

References

External links

 

Incorporated cities and towns in California
Cities in Fresno County, California
Populated places established in 1914